Hecalini is a tribe of leafhoppers in the family Cicadellidae. There are about 24 genera and over 180 described species divided into two subtribes in Hecalini.

Genera
Hecalini currently contains 24 described genera divided into two subtribes:

Subtribe Glossocratina 

 Glossocratus 

Subtribe Hecalina

References

Further reading

 

 
Deltocephalinae
Hemiptera tribes